The Ministry of Justice of Cook Islands provides support to the judiciary so that it may be an impartial system. The ministry is responsible for the following duties: management and rehabilitation of prisoners and probationers, maintaining land and survey information, registration of vital records, electoral policies, and managing the Land Trust account.

List of ministers (Post-1984 upon the country's first coalition government) 

 Teariki Matenga (1985-1986)
 David Ngatupuna (1986-1988)
 Tekaotiki Matapo (1989-1999)
 Tangata Vavia (2000-2003)
 Robert Wigmore (2003-2008)
 Tangata Vavia (2008-2010)
 Apii Piho (2010-2011)
 Henry Puna (2011-2015)
 Teariki Heather (2015)
 Nandi Glassie (2015–present)

See also 

 Justice ministry
 Politics of the Cook Islands

References 

Justice ministries
Government of the Cook Islands